The 2006 American Le Mans at Mid-Ohio was the third race for the 2006 American Le Mans Series season at the Mid-Ohio Sports Car Course.  It took place on May 21, 2006.

This was the first time since the 2003 Grand Prix of Sonoma that the smaller Le Mans Prototype class was able to win the race overall, with both LMP2 class Penske Porsches finishing ahead of the LMP1 Audi R8.

Official results

Class winners in bold.  Cars failing to complete 70% of winner's distance marked as Not Classified (NC).

Statistics
 Pole Position - #6 Penske Racing - 1:12.815
 Fastest Lap - #6 Penske Racing - 1:13.774
 Distance - 
 Average Speed -

External links
 

M
Sports Car Challenge of Mid-Ohio
2006 in sports in Ohio